Naomi Feil is an American gerontologist who developed Validation therapy (holistic therapy that focuses on empathy and provides means for people with cognitive deficit and dementia to communicate).

Early life and education
She was born in Munich, Germany in 1932, and grew up in the Montefiore Home for the Aged in Cleveland. Her mother was the head of the Social Service Department and her father was the administrator. She says that her childhood environment has significantly contributed in shaping the insight into the world of the elderly. 

Feil has a Master’s degree in Social Work from Columbia University.

Career
Between 1963 and 1980 Naomi developed Validation Therapy as alternative to traditional methods of working with the severely disoriented aged people. Validation: The Feil Method was her first book published in 1982 followed by The Validation Breakthrough which was her second  published in 1993.

References 

Living people
American gerontologists
Columbia University School of Social Work alumni
Bavarian emigrants to the United States
Year of birth missing (living people)